Simele District is a district of Dohuk Governorate in Kurdistan Region, Iraq. The administrative centre is Simele.

Subdistricts
The district has the following sub-districts:
Batel
Fayda
Simele

References

Districts of Dohuk Province
Simele